Ranworth rood screen is considered one of the finest examples of medieval rood screen to have survived the iconoclasm of the English Reformation. It is located in the Church of St Helen, Ranworth, Norfolk, England. The exact dates for the creation of the screen are unknown, though most experts agree that the paintings were probably executed sometime in the 15th century, with the erection of the wooden screen itself possibly occurring some years earlier.

North Retable (St John the Baptist Chapel) 
St Etheldreda, St Agnes, St John the Baptist, St Barbara

North Wing 
St George, St Stephen, Bishop (St Felix?)

Central rood screen (Twelve Apostles)

left central screen 
St Simon, St Thomas, St Bartholomew, St James mjr., St Andrew, St Peter

right central screen 
St Paul, Saint John, St Philip, St James mnr., St Jude, St Matthew

South Wing 
Archbishop Thomas Becket, St Lawrence, St Michael.

South Retable (The Lady Chapel) 
St Mary Salome, Virgin Mary, St Mary Cleophas, St Margaret of Antioch

References

Bibliography
 Lasko and Morgan (eds.), P and N.J,Medieval Art in East Anglia 1300-1520, 1973, Jarrold & Sons Ltd., Norwich
 Lasko and Morgan (eds.), P and N.J,Medieval Art in East Anglia 1300-1520, 1974, Thames & Hudson Ltd, 
 Mortlock and Roberts, D.P. and C.V.,The Guide to Norfolk Churches, The Lutterworth Press, 2007
 Munro Cautley, H., Norfolk Churches, The Boydell Press, 1949
 Pye, Adrian S., A photographic and historical guide to the Parish Churches of East Norfolk, ASPYE, 2010
 Yaxley, Susan: The Reformation in Norfolk Parish Churches, Witley Press Ltd., 1990

External links

 Hi-res images of Ranworth Rood Screen
 Norfolk Churches - Ranworth information and images
 Broadside Parishes - images and information

15th-century works
Arts in Norfolk
Church architecture
Medieval art
Screens (partitions)